Belzoni may refer to:

Places
 Belzoni, Mississippi
 Belzoni, Oklahoma

People
 Giovanni Battista Belzoni (1778–1823), sometimes known as The Great Belzoni, a prolific Italian explorer and pioneer archaeologist of Egyptian antiquities